Old Pickens Jail, also known as Pickens County Jail, is a historic jail located at Pickens, Pickens County, South Carolina.  It was built in 1903, and is a two-story, brick building with a two-story crenellated tower.  It was expanded in 1928 to provide additional space for the cellblock.  The jail closed in August 1975, and has since been used as a historical museum and art gallery.

This building gained infamy when Willie Earle was forcefully removed from the Pickens County Jail by a mob on February 16, 1947. When confronted by the mob, the jailer's response was: "I guess you boys know what you're doing." Willie Earle was subsequently lynched nearby in Greenville County, SC.

It was listed on the National Register of Historic Places in 1979.

References 

Jails on the National Register of Historic Places in South Carolina
Government buildings completed in 1903
Buildings and structures in Pickens County, South Carolina
National Register of Historic Places in Pickens County, South Carolina
Pickens, South Carolina
Jails in South Carolina